Pempeliella alibotuschella is a species of snout moth described by Alexander Kirilow Drenowski in 1932. It is found in Bulgaria.

References

Moths described in 1962
Phycitini
Moths of Europe
Taxa named by Alexander Kirilow Drenowski